Jimmy Ross was a Scottish rugby union player. He was the 93rd President of the Scottish Rugby Union.

Rugby Union career

Amateur career

He went to George Heriot's School and was captain of the school in 1940.

He played for  Heriots.

Referee career

He refereed in the 1954 Kelso Sevens.

Administrative career

He was a president of Heriots.

He was Vice-President of the SRU in 1978.

Ross became the 93rd President of the Scottish Rugby Union. He served the standard one year from 1979 to 1980.

Death

Ross died on 22 December 1997. The Glasgow Herald told of the time when Ross - with a SRU party of dignities - was with their sports journalist travelling to watch Scotland play France. The party was directed by the French police the wrong way up a one-way street to speed their progress to the Parc des Princes. The journalist recalled Ross's quip: 'If they had got their army to the Front this quickly, the course of history might have been changed'. The obituary noted that Ross was a journalist's delight: a man with an opinion on everything; and his best stories were told against himself.

He was cremated on 29 December 1997.

References

1997 deaths
Scottish rugby union players
Presidents of the Scottish Rugby Union
Heriot's RC players
Scottish rugby union referees